Thambemyia is a genus of flies in the family Dolichopodidae. It known from the Oriental and Neotropical realms, with a single Palearctic species from Japan. Members of the genus live exclusively on rocky seashores. Conchopus is sometimes considered a synonym of Thambemyia, but the former is considered a valid genus by some authors.

Species
Subgenus Thambemyia Oldroyd, 1956:
Thambemyia bisetosa Masunaga, Saigusa & Grootaert, 2005 – Hong Kong (Lantau Island)
Thambemyia bruneiensis Masunaga, Saigusa & Grootaert, 2005 – Brunei
Thambemyia fusariae Capellari, 2015 – Brazil (Bahia)
Thambemyia hui Masunaga, Saigusa & Grootaert, 2005 – China (Fujian), Taiwan
Thambemyia lopatini Grichanov, 2013 – India (Gujarat)
Thambemyia pagdeni Oldroyd, 1956 – Malaysia (Penang Island), Thailand (Phuket Island)

Subgenus Prothambemyia Masunaga, Saigusa & Grootaert, 2005:
Thambemyia japonica Masunaga, Saigusa & Grootaert, 2005 – Japan (Shikoku, Kyushu)

If Conchopus is a synonym of Thambemyia, the following species would also be included in the genus:
Thambemyia abdominalis (Takagi, 1965)
Thambemyia acrosticalis (Parent, 1937)
Thambemyia anomalopus (Takagi, 1965)
Thambemyia borealis (Takagi, 1965)
Thambemyia convergens (Takagi, 1965)
Thambemyia corvus (Takagi, 1965)
Thambemyia mammuthus (Takagi, 1965)
Thambemyia nodulata (Takagi, 1965)
Thambemyia poseidonia (Takagi, 1965)
Thambemyia pudica (Takagi, 1965)
Thambemyia recta (Takagi, 1965)
Thambemyia saigusai (Takagi, 1965)
Thambemyia shandongensis Zhu, Yang & Masunaga, 2005
Thambemyia sigmigra (Takagi, 1965)
Thambemyia signata (Takagi, 1965)
Thambemyia sikokiana (Takagi, 1965)
Thambemyia sinuata (Takagi, 1965)
Thambemyia taivanensis (Takagi, 1967)
Thambemyia uvasima (Takagi, 1965)

References

Further reading
 

Hydrophorinae
Dolichopodidae genera
Diptera of Asia
Taxa named by Harold Oldroyd
Diptera of South America